A total solar eclipse occurred on February 14, 1934. A solar eclipse occurs when the Moon passes between Earth and the Sun, thereby totally or partly obscuring the image of the Sun for a viewer on Earth. A total solar eclipse occurs when the Moon's apparent diameter is larger than the Sun's, blocking all direct sunlight, turning day into darkness. Totality occurs in a narrow path across Earth's surface, with the partial solar eclipse visible over a surrounding region thousands of kilometres wide. Totality was visible from the Dutch East Indies (today's Indonesia), North Borneo (now belonging to Malaysia), and the South Seas Mandate of Japan (the part now belonging to FS Micronesia).

Related eclipses

Solar eclipses 1931–1935

Saros 139

Notes

References

1934 02 14
1934 in science
1934 02 14
February 1934 events